Nizwa is the largest city in Ad Dakhiliyah Region in Oman and was the capital of Oman proper. Nizwa is about  (1.5 hours) from Muscat. The population is estimated at around 72,000 people, including the two areas of Burkat Al Mooz and Al-Jabel Al-Akhdar.

Nizwa is one of the oldest cities in Oman and it was once a center of trade, religion, education and art. Its Jama (grand mosque) was formerly a center for Islamic learning. Nizwa acquired its importance because it has been an important meeting point at the base of the Western Hajar Mountains. Set amid a verdant spread of date palms, it is strategically located at the crossroads of routes linking the interior with Muscat and the lower reaches of Dhofar thus serving as the link for a large part of the country. Today, Nizwa is a diverse prosperous place with numerous agricultural, historical and recreational aspects. Nizwa is a center for date growing and is the market place for the area.

Etymology
Historians cannot agree on the origins of the name of the city. Some suggest the name was derived from the Arabic verb which means being alone. Others say that the city was named after an old water spring.

History

Nizwa was the capital of Oman in the 6th and 7th centuries AD. With its deep connection to the root of Islam, Nizwa possesses a number of renowned mosques, such as Sultan Qaboos Jama (Friday mosque), So'al Mosque built in the 2nd century AH (9th century AD), Ash-Shawathinah Mosque in Uqr and Ash-Sharja Mosque. There are also Al-Ain Mosque, Ash-Sheikh Mosque and Shuraij Mosque in Tanuf built in 377 AH (around 1000 AD).

A handwritten letter from Muhammad in 630 asked the locals of the mountain town of Nizwa to convert. The locals then sent a return delegation to Medina and embraced Islam. A tutor was sent by Muhammad to teach the new Muslims of Nizwa the fundamentals of the religion.

The traveler Ibn Battuta visited in the 14th century, noting Nizwa as "a city at the foot of a mountain, enveloped by orchards and streams, and with fine bazaars and splendid clean mosques."

In the early 1950s, the large round tower of the ancient fort built in the center of the town was bombed and rocketed by the British Royal Air Force, who were called in to assist the then-reigning Sultan Said bin Taymour in suppressing a revolt by leaders of the interior Imamate of Oman. The conflict was driven by a struggle for a share of Oman's newly discovered oil wealth.

Nizwa has become a more modern city since 1970 under the reign of Sultan Qaboos. Improvements include connections to Muscat via a two-lane highway, which has increased tourism.  Communications have been improved to include broadband access, and the city is home to a substantial hospital. It is also a hub for education including a Technical College, College of Applied Sciences, The University of Nizwa, and the training academy for the Royal Oman Police. There are now many hotels and tourism is promoted in the area.

Geography and climate
Mountains surround Nizwa on every side and there is outstanding mountain scenery close by. Nizwa has an arid climate under the Köppen climate classification. In the winter from November until March the climate is pleasant, with temperatures as low as 12 degrees Celsius in January. In the summer, the climate is hot and dry with temperatures reaching 45 degrees Celsius in July.

Attractions
The main tourist attractions in the city are the Nizwa Fort, the traditional souq or market, and the Falaj Daris irrigation system, which was named a UNESCO World Heritage Site in 2006. In the 1990s, the mosque, fort, and souq, which are located next to each other in the city centre, were renovated using traditional materials. In 1993 Nizwa won the award of 'Organisation of Arab Cities'.

Nizwa Fort

Nizwa Fort was built in 1668 AD by Imam Sultan Bin Saif Al Ya'rubi, and today is Oman's most visited national monument. The fort was the administrative seat of authority for the presiding imams and walis in times of peace and conflict. The main bulk of the fort took about 12 years to complete and was built above an underground stream. The fort is a reminder of the town's significance through turbulent periods in Oman's long history. It was a formidable stronghold against raiding forces that desired Nizwa's abundant natural wealth and its strategic crossroads location.

Nizwa Souq

The city, famous for its handicrafts and agricultural products, has an expansive souq with an array of products. It is one of the most important in the country besides Muttrah. The souq bustles with vendors selling everything from meat, fish, fruits and vegetables to spices, dates, gold and silverware. Nizwa is renowned for its silver jewelry which is considered to be the best in the country. Its people are masters in making khanjars (curved daggers), recognised for their distinctive style and patterns. They also make copper ware, coffee pots, swords, leather goods and pottery.

Falaj Daris
Falaj Daris, a UNESCO World Heritage Site, is the largest falaj, or irrigation system, in Oman. It provides the surrounding countryside with much-needed water for farming. Al Ghantuq and Dhoot are two other important irrigation systems in Nizwa. Farming is widely practiced and the town's immense palm farms stretch for eight kilometers along the course of two wadis, Kalbouh and Al Abiad.

Economy

Historically, Nizwa was known for producing mats from straw. As of 1920, the city was described as having a "thriving" metalworking industry.

Education
University of Nizwa
University of Technology and Applied Sciences
Indian School Nizwa, a high school for international students with an Indian majority
Pakistan School Nizwa, a co-educational Pakistani school, founded in 1994 under the patronage of Embassy of Pakistan

Transport
A short drive from Nizwa centre is the old village of Tanuf, known for its seasonal waterfalls. Waterfalls in Tanuf are unique to the area within the steep mountain sides and the water reservoir.

Nizwa is connected to the UAE city of Al Ain by road, via the Mezyad border post. This road also goes past the Provinces of Ibri and Dhank.

Notable people 

 Ahmed Al-Harrasi, is an Omani scientist and a professor of organic chemistry at University of Nizwa.
 Arshad Al-Alawi,  is an Omani professional footballer. 
 Alkhattab Alhinai, is the Deputy Chairman of Oman State Council.
 Bal'arab bin Himyar, was an Omani Imam, a member of Yaruba dynasty.

See also 
 List of cities in Oman

References

Sources 
Scheerpenzel, E: Oman Then and Now SPB Academic Publishing, 2000.
 Antonio Farach, Lucille Umali – Times of Oman / Shabiba (2011) "The Great Fort of Nizwa"

External links 
 https://www.ncsi.gov.om/Elibrary/LibraryContentDoc/bar_Census%20Final%20Result%202010_388bd9c6-a938-467d-8c92-f6950cc1785f.pdf

 
Populated places in Oman
Ad Dakhiliyah Governorate